The North Coast Athletic Conference (NCAC) is an NCAA Division III athletic conference composed of colleges located in Ohio and Indiana. When founded in 1984, the league was a pioneer in gender equality, offering competition in a then-unprecedented 10 women's sports. Today it remains true to that legacy, sponsoring 23 sports, 11 for men and 12 for women.

The NCAC is respected for the academic strength of its member institutions — all of which have Phi Beta Kappa chapters. In its most recent college rankings, U.S. News & World Report recognized all 10 members as top-tier liberal arts colleges, and ranked five NCAC institutions among the nation's top 70 such colleges.

History
The formation of the NCAC was announced at joint news conferences in Cleveland, Columbus and Pittsburgh in February 1983. Allegheny College, Case Western Reserve University (CWRU), Denison University, Kenyon College, Oberlin College, Ohio Wesleyan University, and The College of Wooster were charter members in 1984, the same year that NCAC athletic conference play began.

In 1988, Earlham College and Wittenberg College accepted invitations to join the NCAC, pushing conference membership to nine schools in three states. The two schools would begin play in the fall of 1989. In 1998, Hiram College, and Wabash College accepted invitations to join the NCAC, pushing conference membership to 10 schools in three states, which both schools began play in the fall of 1999. Case Western Reserve, a charter member of the NCAC, announced that it would leave the NCAC following the 1998–99 academic year. The Spartans would compete on a full-time basis in the University Athletic Association (UAA) after more than a decade of joint conference membership affiliation.

Earlham announced it would depart the NCAC for the Heartland Collegiate Athletic Conference (HCAC), beginning with the 2010–11 season. DePauw University became the 10th member of the NCAC beginning in the 2011–12 season.

Allegheny left the NCAC after the 2021–22 school year to return to its former home of the Presidents' Athletic Conference. Allegheny and Earlham remain single-sport NCAC members in field hockey.

The most recent change to the NCAC membership was announced on November 15, 2022. Transylvania University and Washington & Jefferson College will join the NCAC as single-sport members in the sport of field hockey, beginning with the 2023 season.

Chronological timeline
 1983 - In February 1983, the North Coast Athletic Conference (NCAC) was founded. Charter members included Allegheny College, Case Western Reserve University (CWRU), Denison University, Kenyon College, Oberlin College, Ohio Wesleyan University and The College of Wooster, effective beginning the 1984–85 academic year.
 1988 - Earlham College and Wittenberg College joined the NCAC, effective in the 1989–90 academic year.
 1999 - Case Western Reserve left the NCAC to fully align all of its sports to the University Athletic Association (UAA), effective after the 1998–99 academic year.
 1998 - Hiram College and Wabash College joined the NCAC, effective in the 1999–2000 academic year.
 2010 - Earlham left the NCAC to join the Heartland Collegiate Athletic Conference (HCAC), effective after the 2009–10 academic year.
 2011 - DePauw University joined the NCAC, effective in the 2011–12 academic year.
 2022 - Allegheny left the NCAC to rejoin the Presidents' Athletic Conference (PAC) after a 38-year absence, effective in the 2022–23 academic year.

Member schools

Current members
The NCAC currently has nine full members, all private schools.

Notes

Former members
The NCAC has three former full members, all private schools. Allegheny and Earlham remain NCAC members in field hockey.

Notes

Membership timeline

See also
Five Colleges of Ohio
NCAC men's basketball tournament

References

External links
 

 
1983 establishments in the United States